"Tombé pour elle" is a 1994 song recorded by French singer and composer Pascal Obispo. Written by Obispo who also composed the music, it was produced by Obispo and François Delabrière. Released in September 1995, as the lead single of the album Un jour comme aujourd'hui, the song achieved success in France where it peaked at number 12 for four weeks and remained on the top 50 for 22 weeks. In 1998, the song was performed during the singer's first tour and included in the album Live 98, and was released as a live single, but poorly charted. The song was included in the singer's 2013 best of album Millésimes.

"Tombé pour elle" is a tribute to the region in which Obispo spent his holidays in his childhood. In the lyrics he mentions two cities and an island of the Gironde department (Arcachon, Cap-Ferret, the Île aux Oiseaux), which he calls "my house, my Eiffel Tower [...] my Tower of Babel, my light, my stronghold".

Track listings
 CD single
 "Tombé pour elle (L'ile aux oiseaux)"
 "Ma consolation"

 CD single
 "Tombé pour elle" (live version)
 "Mon avion t'attend"

Charts and sales

Peak positions

Year-end charts

References

1996 singles
1998 singles
Pascal Obispo songs
Songs with music by Pascal Obispo
1995 songs
Epic Records singles
Live singles